Fundamental is the ninth studio album by English synth-pop duo Pet Shop Boys. It was released in May 2006 in the United Kingdom, Europe, Japan and Canada. It was released in late June 2006 in the United States. The album entered the UK Albums Chart at number five on 28 May 2006. In the US the album peaked at number 150 selling 7,500 copies in its first week. As of April 2009 it had sold 46,000 copies in the US and 66,000 copies in the UK. Fundamental earned two Grammy nominations at the 2007 Grammy Awards for Best Dance/Electronic Album and Best Dance Recording with "I'm with Stupid".

The album was produced by the Pet Shop Boys and Trevor Horn and it features eleven new Pet Shop Boys compositions, and "Numb", written by Diane Warren (Neil Tennant and Chris Lowe originally planned to have "Numb" be one of two new tracks on PopArt, but opted instead for "Miracles" and "Flamboyant").

The liner notes show that the album is dedicated to two executed Iranian gay teenagers, Mahmoud Asgari and Ayaz Marhoni, who were hanged on 19 July 2005. Some reports have suggested the two may have been executed for engaging in homosexual behaviour, though the official Iranian report was that they were hanged for raping a 13-year-old boy. The album was very well received by critics, some considering it to be their best album since Very, but its sales failed to improve much on the sales of their last two albums.

The album re-entered the UK Album Chart at number thirty-two in 2017 following the album's Further Listening 2005-2007 reissue.

Overview

Subject matter
The album has been noted for being more political than any other of the duo's albums to date; even the title, in one sense, is a reference to religious fundamentalism – portrayed here in a light, critical manner, which singer Neil Tennant attributes to the relatively relaxed status of religious freedom in the United Kingdom.

Specific contemporary issues discussed in the lyrics include tensions and fears in the United States caused by the War on Terrorism, addressed in songs such as "Psychological" and "Luna Park" ("Luna Park" being the name of various amusement parks around the world). Other songs refer to the politics of the band's home country; "Indefinite leave to remain" refers to an immigration status in the United Kingdom, while "Integral" criticises the Identity Cards Act 2006. (A statement from a band spokesman cites the issue as the reason that Tennant ceased his well-publicized support of Tony Blair's Labour Party.) "I'm with Stupid", meanwhile, touches upon both countries by satirizing Blair's alliance with George W. Bush. (See also special relationship.)

Other subject matters are dealt with as well. "Casanova in Hell" is about the 18th century historical figure Giacomo Casanova, and how he immortalized himself by writing memoirs about his history of sexual seduction of numerous women. Tennant refers to, specifically, the book Casanova's Homecoming by Arthur Schnitzler as his inspiration for the song. (It was sung by Rufus Wainwright at its very first live performance, at a private concert recorded for BBC Radio 2 at the Mermaid Theatre on 8 May 2006.) "The Sodom and Gomorrah Show" references two of the biblical cities of sin, Sodom and Gomorrah, in saying that to learn to 'go where angels fear to tread' (i.e. to sin) is to learn to live freely.

Music
The album is Pet Shop Boys' first collaboration with Trevor Horn since the 1989 single "It's Alright". Its sound bears the producer's heavily orchestral style (also present on that song), most frequently associated with the 1982 ABC album The Lexicon of Love as well as the 1984 Frankie Goes to Hollywood single "Two Tribes" and subsequent album Welcome to the Pleasuredome. Horn was also musical director for the Radio 2 concert, which featured the BBC Concert Orchestra.

The album's personnel included many of Horn's frequent musical collaborators, including Anne Dudley, Tessa Niles, Jamie Muhoberac, Phil Palmer, Steve Lipson, Lol Creme, Tim Pierce, Earl Harvin, Frank Ricotti, Luis Jardim, Lucinda Barry.

Fundamentalism
Special limited editions of the album include a second bonus CD called Fundamentalism. The disc includes remixed tracks with contributions by artists such as Alter Ego. "In Private", here presented as a duet with Elton John, was originally a Dusty Springfield song written and produced by the Pet Shop Boys. First released as a single in 1989, it was later included on the 1990 album Reputation. The powerful opening track "Fugitive" contains lyrics suggestive of a dialogue between a male terrorist and a person who has a close relationship with him - originally conceived by Tennant as the terrorist's sister, but later re-cast in his thoughts as either the terrorist's sister, his brother or a close friend - thus continuing the political themes of the main album.

Track listing
All songs written by Neil Tennant and Chris Lowe, except where noted.

Fundamental
"Psychological" – 4:10
"The Sodom and Gomorrah Show" – 5:19 (Tennant)
"I Made My Excuses and Left" – 4:53
"Minimal" – 4:21
"Numb" – 4:43 (Diane Warren)
"God Willing" – 1:17
"Luna Park" – 5:31
"I'm with Stupid" – 3:24
"Casanova in Hell" – 3:13
"Twentieth Century" – 4:39
"Indefinite Leave to Remain" – 3:08 (Tennant)
"Integral" – 3:55

Fundamentalism

Further Listening 2005–2007

Personnel
Pet Shop Boys
Neil Tennant - lead and backing vocals, keyboards, guitar
Chris Lowe - keyboards, synthesizers, drum programming, rapping

Guest musicians
Pete Gleadall – original programming
Nick Ingman – orchestral arrangement and conduction on tracks 1, 3, 4, 6, 7, 9 & 12
Alanna Tavernier and Laura Edwards – backing vocals on track 1
Pete Murray – additional keyboards on track 1, 4, 5, 10 & 11
Jamie Muhoberac – additional keyboards on tracks 1, 2, 3, 4, 5, 7, 8, 10, 11 & 12; bass on track 4
Patrick Lannigan – bass on track 1, 3 & 4
Earl Harvin – vibraphone on tracks 1 & 2; acoustic drums on track 1, 2, 3, 4, 5, 7, 9, 11 & 12; electronic drums on track 1, 2, 3, 4, 7, 8, 9, 10, 11 & 12; marimba on track 2 & 4; bass on track 3
Skaila Kanga – harp on tracks 1, 3, 4, 6, 7 & 9
Anne Dudley – orchestral and brass arrangement and conducting on tracks 2 & 11
Helene Parker, Sarah Eyden, Emma Brain Gabbot and Julia Doyle – backing vocals on track 2
Tessa Niles – backing vocals on tracks 2, 8, 9 & 12
Jenny O'Grady – choir master on track 2
Fred Applegate – narration on track 2
Oliver Pouliot – additional voice on track 2
Dave Clayton – additional keyboards and programming on tracks 2, 7 & 9; keyboards and programming on track 6
Luca Baldini – additional keyboards on tracks 2 & 11, additional programming on track 2
Phil Palmer – guitar on tracks 2, 4, 7, 8, 9, 10 & 11
Steve Lipson – guitar on tracks 2 & 12
Lalo Creme – guitar on tracks 2, 8, 10 & 12
Trevor Horn – guitar on tracks 2, 6, 9, 11 & 12; bass guitar on tracks 2, 4, 6 & 7; additional keyboards on track 3 & 7; additional vocals on track 4, additional programming on track 7
Virgil Howe – acoustic drums on track 2; percussion on track 7
Cliff Hewitt – electronic drums on tracks 2, 7, 8; acoustic drums on track 9; percussion on track 12
Frank Ricotti – percussion on tracks 2, 7, 9, 10 & 12
Lucinda Barry – harp on tracks 2, 4, 7, 9 & 12; backing vocals on tracks 9 & 12
Steve Sidwell – orchestral arrangement and conducting on track 5
Gavyn Wright – orchestra leader on track 5
Tim Pierce – acoustic and electric guitars on track 5
Luís Jardim – percussion on track 5
Simon Chamberlain – additional keyboards on track 7
Robert Orton – shaker on track 7
Debi Doss – backing vocals on tracks 9 & 12
Andy Caine and Bruce Woolley – backing vocals on track 12

Guests on Fundamentalism
Pete Gleadall – Original programming
Richard X – Production on track 1
Pete Hoffman – Mix on track 1
Anders Trentemøller – Additional production, instrumentation and remixing on track 2
Mikael Simpson – Additional bass on track 2
Roman Flügel and Jörn Elling – Remix and additional production on track 3
Michael Mayer and Superpitcher – Remix production on track 4
Melnyk – Remix and additional production on track 5
Elton John – Duet vocals on track 6
Stuart Chrichton – Production and mix on track 6
Lobe – Remix and additional production on track 7
Olof Dettinger – Remix production on track 8

Fundamental (original track listing)
On 22 December 2005, the official Pet Shop Boys website announced an early track listing for the album and gave a release date of 17 April 2006 with new single "Minimal" arriving a few weeks beforehand. This was quickly followed up on 23 December, when pop music fansite Popjustice gave the first review of the album.
On 13 February 2006, it was announced that the release date of Fundamental had been pushed back to 22 May, because EMI needed "more set-up time". At the same time "I'm with Stupid" was announced to be the revised lead single. This was followed on 4 April 2006, with news that there would be a limited edition of the new album that would include a bonus CD called Fundamentalism.

Singles
"Psychological" – In December 2005, a limited 12-inch white label of "Psychological" was released. This one-track promo single featured an instrumental mix of the track, clocking in at 4:05.
"I'm with Stupid" – the first commercially available single from Fundamental released 8 May 2006 in the UK.
"Minimal" – released 24 July 2006, "Minimal" was announced by the Pet Shop Boys on 6 May as the second commercially available single from Fundamental in the UK.
"Numb" – released on 16 October 2006, announced on the official website on 4 September.
"Integral" – a new version of this song was released to promote the album Disco 4.

B-sides and other released songs
"Fugitive" (Fundamentalism, "Beautiful People" German release B-side)
"In Private" (featuring Elton John) (Fundamentalism remix and "Minimal" original B-side)
"The Resurrectionist" ("I'm with Stupid" B-side)
"Girls Don't Cry" ("I'm with Stupid" B-side)
"Blue on Blue" ("Minimal" B-side)
"No Time for Tears" (Battleship Potemkin original, "Minimal" B-side)
"Party Song" ("Numb" B-side)
"Bright Young Things" ("Numb" B-side)
"Psychological" (Ewan Pearson remix) (Fundamental original, "Numb" remix)

Release details
The album was released in various countries:

Charts

Weekly charts

Year-end charts

Certifications and sales

References

External links
Pet Shop Boys' official website

2006 albums
Pet Shop Boys albums
Parlophone albums
Rhino Entertainment albums
Albums produced by Trevor Horn